St Albans Riverside is a park in Hampton in the London Borough of Richmond upon Thames. It is linear with long sides between the Thames and Hampton Court Road. It runs from southeast of Garrick's Villa and his Temple to Shakespeare, Garrick's Lawn, Thames Street to a point 90 metres southeast of the interrupting small bridge that serves Tagg's Island.

About
The area has much greenery and various seating areas. It is named after Aubrey Beauclerk, 5th Duke of St Albans (1740–1802) who moved to Hampton In 1796, living in St Albans Lodge (previously St Albans Bank) before taking up Hanworth Park House.

Local area and landmarks

A marina followed by sailing club is to the west and Hampton Court Green to the east. Hampton Court Palace is beyond the Green. In the park, is a sundial designed by David Harber in the shape of a steel globe. Below it is a plaque which reads:

 

The sundial was commissioned by the widow of Gerald George 'Gerry' Braban (1931–1993), who lobbied for and co-funded the  bridge to Tagg's Island that was built in the 1990s.

Transport 
The park is served by a cycleway linked with Bushy Park and buses:
111 between Kingston: Cromwell Road Bus Station and Heathrow Airport via Hounslow
216 between Kingston: Cromwell Road Bus Station and Staines: Bus Station via Sunbury Village
R68 between  East Molesey: Hampton Court Bridge and Kew: Retail Park via Teddington and Twickenham.

Footpaths reach across Bushy Park using the facing Hampton Gate to/from: Hampton Hill Gate, Hampton Wick Gate and Teddington (& Sandy Lane) Gates serving those three districts.

References

External links
 Official website

Parks and open spaces in the London Borough of Richmond upon Thames
Hampton, London
Parks and open spaces on the River Thames
Sundials